The HD Pentax-D FA* 70–200mm f/2.8 ED DC AW lens is a professional telephoto zoom lens for the Pentax K-mount. Announced jointly with the HD PENTAX-D FA 150-450mm F4.5-5.6ED DC AW in February 2015, it is one a pair of full-frame lenses to reboot Pentax' involvement in that format, the last previously introduced full-frame lens being the D FA 100mm weather-sealed macro lens in 2009. On Pentax APS-C cameras, the D FA* 70–200mm has an equivalent focal length range of 107–307mm.

This lens represents several "firsts" for Pentax. It is the first Pentax lens to feature Super ED glass for improved chromatic aberration suppression and Aero Bright II nano-coating to minimize flare. The D FA* 70–200mm lens is also one of the first two Pentax lenses to feature an improved implementation of the Quick-Shift Focus System (full-time manual focus), with QFS/A and QFS/M positions on the autofocus switch. In QFS/A mode, the lens will not allow manual focus during autofocus operation until focusing is complete. In QFS/M mode, autofocus will stop and switch to manual focus immediately as soon as the focus ring is turned.

See also 
Pentax (lens)

References

External links 
HD Pentax-D FA* 70–200mm f/2.8 ED DC AW, official Product page
HD PENTAX-D FA 70-200mm F2.8 ED DC AWA high-performance, Star-series telephoto zoom lens, press release
Introduction the D FA* 70-200mm, Pentax Story
Examples of images list,  PENTAX K-1 Laboratory

70-200
Camera lenses introduced in 2015